The Cumberland Cup is the current senior county cup in the ancient county of Cumberland. It is administered by the Cumberland Football Association (CFA). According to the current rules of the competition, it is open to all clubs whose first affiliation is with the CFA. 

Currently Carlisle United are the only professional team from the football league in the competition since Workington left the football league in 1977, so as a result they now tend to enter their reserve team. Other teams that enter are Workington, Cleator Moor Celtic, Penrith, Carlisle City, Whitehaven, and Windscale are from different levels of non-league. The Northern Premier League Division One North West, North West Counties league, Northern League, West Lancashire League and The Wearside League are represented by these teams. Teams from the Cumberland County League and the Westmorland League can also take part as they are covered by the Cumberland Football Association.

In previous years Scottish teams such as Annan Athletic, Gretna and Hearts of Liddesdale have also entered the competition due to being in the Carlisle and District League at the time. In Annan and Gretna's case they have even won the competition several times.

The current holders are Carlisle United who defeated Penrith 3–1 in the 2018–19 final at Brunton Park, Carlisle.

Winners
The last win for a club is shown in bold.

Most Wins

Recent Finals

References

County Cup competitions